The 1969 NBA draft was the 23rd annual draft of the National Basketball Association (NBA). The draft was held on April 7 and May 7, 1969, before the 1969–70 season. In this draft, fourteen NBA teams took turns selecting amateur U.S. college basketball players. A player who had finished his four-year college eligibility was eligible for selection. If a player left college early, he would not be eligible for selection until his college class graduated.

The first two picks in the draft belonged to the teams that finished last in each division, with the order determined by a coin flip. The Milwaukee Bucks won the coin flip in the commissioner's New York office on March 19 and were awarded the first overall pick, while the Phoenix Suns went second. The remaining first-round picks and the subsequent rounds were assigned to teams in reverse order of their win–loss record in the previous season. The Los Angeles Lakers were awarded an extra first-round draft pick as settlement of the Rudy LaRusso trade to the San Francisco Warriors. The draft consisted of twenty rounds and selected 218 players.

Draftee career notes
Lew Alcindor (later known as Kareem Abdul-Jabbar) from UCLA was selected first overall by the Milwaukee Bucks. He went on to win the Rookie of the Year Award and was selected to both All-NBA Second Team and All-Star Game in his first season. The following season, the Bucks acquired 31-year old point guard Oscar Robertson from the Cincinnati Royals. They led the Bucks to a league-best 66 wins in the regular season. The Bucks then beat the Baltimore Bullets in the Finals to win their first NBA championship, in only their third season. In that season, Alcindor also won the Most Valuable Player Award and Finals Most Valuable Player Award. He went on to win five more NBA championships in the 1980s with the Los Angeles Lakers, where he teamed up with Magic Johnson, the first pick in 1979. He also won another Finals Most Valuable Player Award in 1985. He won a total of six Most Valuable Player Award, the most in the history of the NBA. He also held the record for the most All-Star Game selections with 19 and the most All-NBA Team selections with 15. Furthermore, he was selected to eleven All-Defensive Teams, the second most selections. He retired as all–time league scoring leader with 38,387 points and the all–time league leader in total blocked shots with 3,189 blocks. For his achievements, he has been inducted to the Basketball Hall of Fame. He was also named in the 50 Greatest Players in NBA History list announced at the league's 50th anniversary in 1996.

Jo Jo White, the ninth pick, won two NBA championships with the Boston Celtics in 1974 and 1976. He was named as the Finals Most Valuable Player in the latter. He was selected to two All-NBA Teams and seven All-Star Games. 45th pick Bob Dandridge won two NBA championships with the Milwaukee Bucks in 1971 and with the Washington Bullets in the 1978. He was selected to one All-NBA Team and four All-Star Games. Norm Van Lier, the 34th pick, was selected to both the All-NBA Team and the All-Star Game. He was also selected to eight All-Defensive Teams. Two other players from this draft, 10th pick Butch Beard and 61st pick Steve Mix, was also selected to an All-Star Game. Beard became a head coach after his playing career, he coached the New Jersey Nets for two seasons in the 1990s. Three other players drafted also went on to have a coaching career: 43rd pick Fred Carter, 68th pick Gene Littles and 187th pick Mack Calvin.

In the 13th round, the San Francisco Warriors selected Denise Long, a girl's high school player from Whitten, Iowa. Long, who averaged 62.8 points per game in her senior year, became the first female ever to be drafted by an NBA team. However, the selection was later voided by commissioner J. Walter Kennedy as a publicity stunt. In the 15th round, the Phoenix Suns selected track and field athlete Bob Beamon from the University of Texas at El Paso with the 189th pick. He had just broken the world record for long jump and won the gold medal at the 1968 Olympic Games. Although he had played basketball before his athletics career, he stayed with it and never played in the NBA.

Draft selections

Notable undrafted players
These players were not selected in the 1969 draft but played at least one game in the NBA.

Trades
 On October 20, 1967, the Chicago Bulls acquired Flynn Robinson, 1968 and 1969 second-round picks from the Cincinnati Royals in exchange for Guy Rodgers. The Bulls used the pick to draft Johnny Baum.
 On August 27, 1968, the Phoenix Suns acquired a second-round pick from the Boston Celtics in exchange for Em Bryant. The Suns used the pick to draft Gene Williams.
 On December 17, 1968, the Phoenix Suns acquired Jim Fox and a third-round pick from the Detroit Pistons in exchange for McCoy McLemore. The Suns used the pick to draft Lamar Green.

Notes

See also
 List of first overall NBA draft picks

References
General

Specific

External links
NBA.com
NBA.com: NBA Draft History
1969 NBA Draft at Basketball Reference

Draft
National Basketball Association draft
NBA draft
NBA draft
NBA draft
Basketball in New York City
Sporting events in New York City